The Big Sandy, East Lynn and Guyan Railroad in West Virginia was incorporated on June 16, 1902.

History
In the 1890s, plans were made for a railroad to connect the Big Sandy River and Guyandotte River.  The planned railroad would start at the mouth of Whites Creek on the Big Sandy River in Wayne County, West Virginia and would proceed to the East Fork of Twelvepole Creek and eventually to the Guyandotte River near Logan, Logan County, West Virginia.  The railroad was planned to pass through the town of East Lynn in Wayne County, West Virginia.

The first leg of the railroad was from the town of Wayne, WV to the town of East Lynn, WV and the first trains ran in the fall of 1903.  However, the railroad was never completed from the Big Sandy River to the Guyandotte.  The Big Sandy, East Lynn and Guyan Railroad sold all of their rights-of-way to the Norfolk and Western Railway in 1908 and went out of business in 1911.  Norfolk Southern trains would continue to operate on the right-of-way up until july 2015 when the last train was sent out.  The line served the Rockspring Development INC mine south of East Lynn, Wayne County, West Virginia.

Defunct West Virginia railroads
Predecessors of the Norfolk and Western Railway
Railway companies established in 1902
Railway companies disestablished in 1908